The China men's national under-21 volleyball team represents China in men's under-21 volleyball events. It is controlled and managed by the Chinese Volleyball Association that is a member of Asian volleyball body Asian Volleyball Confederation (AVC) and the international volleyball body government the Fédération Internationale de Volleyball (FIVB).

Results

FIVB U21 World Championship
 Champions   Runners up   Third place   Fourth place

Team

Current squad

The following is the Chinese roster in the 2019 FIVB Volleyball Men's U21 World Championship.

Head coach: Hao Liu

Notable players

References

External links
Official website

U
National men's under-21 volleyball teams
Volleyball in China